Afghan Luke is a 2011 Canadian war drama film directed by Mike Clattenburg. The central character, Luke Benning (Nick Stahl), is a journalist investigating the possible mutilation (by Canadian snipers) of corpses in Afghanistan, a country that appears increasingly incomprehensible and surreal as Luke undergoes a series of bizarre adventures.

Plot
Disheartened when his story about Canadian snipers possibly mutilating corpses in Afghanistan is buried, Luke (Nick Stahl) quits his job but is even more determined to return to Afghanistan to get the real story. With his offbeat buddy, Tom (Nicolas Wright), tagging along, Luke returns to Afghanistan and intends to gather enough evidence to get his old story into print. But he soon finds that the country is an even more dangerous place than when he left. To make matters worse, his old friend and fixer, Mateen (Stephen Lobo) has been hired away by Luke's journalistic nemesis, Imran Sahar (Vik Sahay). Soon the trip for Luke and Tom in Afghanistan turns into a surreal and perilous adventure, a journey into an alternate reality, filtered through a haze of gun smoke. They encounter Taliban raids, bombings and unfinished business with an Afghanistan businessman. Luke still makes his way through the wilderness with Canadian troops and Arabian guides to find out if his story is true or not. In the end, he realises that the rumour about Canadians mutilating fingers is a lie and that his people still have some morality in this war torn land. Just as he is about to leave, He and Sgt. Rick (a Canadian soldier who is the leader of the squad with whom he had been travelling) come under fire from a Taliban sniper, but the Taliban runs out of bullets and walks off, while Luke thinks he killed him. While they move back to the base, Luke runs into Matteen, where he finds out that they really do share a friendship. The last scene is where Luke decides to go home.

Cast
 Nick Stahl as Luke
 Nicolas Wright as Tom
 Stephen Lobo as Mateen
 Vik Sahay as Imran Sahar
 Pascale Hutton as Elita 
 Steve Cochrane as Sergeant Rick Cahoon
 Torrance Coombs as Private Davey 
 Ali Liebert as Miss Freedom
 Colin Cunningham as Lieutenant Christer
 Parm Soor as Ustad Mir
 Ron Lea as Mark
 Lewis Black as Lewis Black

Nomination
The film was nominated for a Writers Guild of Canada 2012 Screenwriting Award and has appeared at the Shanghai International Film Festival, the Toronto International Film Festival, Cinéfest, and the Atlantic Film Festival.

References

External links
 

2011 films
English-language Canadian films
2011 war drama films
Canadian war drama films
Films about war correspondents
Films about war crimes
War in Afghanistan (2001–2021) films
Films set in Afghanistan
Films shot in British Columbia
Films shot in Halifax, Nova Scotia
Films directed by Mike Clattenburg
2011 drama films
2010s English-language films
2010s Canadian films